Mount Pleasant is a city in the U.S. state of Utah. Located in Sanpete County, Mt. Pleasant is known for  being home to Wasatch Academy. As of the 2010 census, the city population was 3,260.

History

In the spring of 1852, Latter-Day Saint colonists from Manti led by Madison D. Hambleton established the Hambleton Settlement near the present site of Mt. Pleasant{{Citation needed}}. During the Wakara War, the settlers relocated to Spring Town (Spring City) and later to Manti for protection{{Citation needed}}. The old settlement was burned down by local Native Americans{{Citation needed}}. A large colonizing party from Ephraim and Manti returned to the area in 1859{{Citation needed}}. This was when a permanent townsite was laid out in its present location. 

Among the founding settlers were Latter-Day Saint converts from Scandinavia, the United Kingdom, and the eastern United States{{Citation needed}}. By 1880, Mt. Pleasant was the county's largest city, with a population of 2,000, and more than 72 percent of its married adults were foreign-born{{Citation needed}}. This ethnic diversity had an important impact on village life during the nineteenth and early twentieth centuries. For decades, five languages were commonly spoken in the town.

The settlement and development of Mt. Pleasant followed the typical pattern for Latter-Day Saint towns of the period{{Citation needed}}. A square-shaped townsite was surveyed, lots were drawn, and the land was distributed among the population{{Citation needed}}. Under the direction of James Russell Ivie (1802–1866), a fort of adobe walls and log cabins was built{{Citation needed}}. Pleasant Creek ran through the fort and farming was done outside of its walls. Ivie was killed in the Ute Black Hawk War by Indians who had declined to participate in the settlement of the earlier Wakara War. Around that time the town acquired its present name{{Citation needed}}. In 1872 the final peace treaty with the Indians was signed in Bishop Seeley's house on Main Street, bringing an end to this conflict. By this time, many settlers had erected homesteads outside of the fort. Although the town site is large in scale, the density is relatively low due to the original layout allowing for only four lots per block.

Some of the first industries in Mt. Pleasant included tanning, shoe making, blacksmithing, basket making, and freighting. Eventual modernization brought such improvements as the Deseret Telegraph in 1869, the Pyramid Newspaper in 1890, and a telephone system in 1891.

Sawmills and flour mills were built, irrigation systems were dug, and a municipal government was created to oversee public laws and improvements. The city was incorporated in 1868, a year after the first cooperative store was founded. Upon the arrival of the Rio Grande Western Railway in 1890, both the local population and the city's prosperity increased dramatically. By 1900, Mt. Pleasant had grown to nearly 3,000 people, the largest size reached by any city in Sanpete County to that time, and the city had earned one of its nicknames, "Hub City."

The increased wealth in the town led to the replacement of small, wood-frame commercial buildings with stone and brick structures such as the 1888 Sanpete County Co-op. Victorian churches, schools, and residences replaced the simpler adobe and log buildings of the pioneer period{{Citation needed}}.

By 1912, the first high school, North Sanpete High School, had been completed. 1912 also brought the Armory Hall, while the Elite Theater was constructed as a "fireproof" building in 1913. It burned down seven decades later{{Citation needed | Date?}}. In 1917, a Carnegie Library was built in a modern architectural style. The Marie Hotel was erected in 1920 and a large cheese factory was built in 1930, the same year that the bus service came to town. The completion of U.S. Highway 89 in 1936 softened the impact of the Great Depression. A city hall was built in 1939 and a hospital in 1945{{Citation needed}}.

Geography

According to the United States Census Bureau, the city has a total area of 2.8 square miles (7.3 km2), all land.

Climate
This climatic region is typified by large seasonal temperature differences, with warm, dry summers and cold (sometimes severely cold) winters.  According to the Köppen Climate Classification system, Mount Pleasant has a warm summer continental climate, abbreviated "DFB" on climate maps.

Demographics

As of the census of 2000, there were 2,707 people, 884 households, and 655 families residing in the city. The population density was 958.8 people per square mile (370.6/km2). There were 975 housing units at an average density of 345.3 per square mile (133.5/km2). The racial makeup of the city was 96.45% White, 0.41% Native American, 0.48% Asian, 0.15% Pacific Islander, 1.18% from other races, and 1.33% from two or more races. Hispanic or Latino of any race were 2.66% of the population.

There were 884 households, out of which 40.7% had children under the age of 18 living with them, 62.0% were married couples living together, 7.6% had a female householder with no husband present, and 25.9% were non-families. 23.4% of all households were made up of individuals, and 13.9% had someone living alone who was 65 years of age or older. The average household size was 2.99 and the average family size was 3.56.

In the city, the population was spread out, with 36.5% under the age of 18, 8.5% from 18 to 24, 22.7% from 25 to 44, 18.6% from 45 to 64, and 13.8% who were 65 years of age or older. The median age was 30 years. For every 100 females, there were 96.6 males. For every 100 females age 18 and over, there were 97.0 males.

The median income for a household in the city was $33,603, and the median income for a family was $40,300. Males had a median income of $32,697 versus $17,279 for females. The per capita income for the city was $13,630. About 7.0% of families and 9.2% of the population were below the poverty line, including 9.3% of those under age 18 and 9.9% of those aged 65 or over.

Arts and culture

Annual cultural events
Hub City Days and the Fourth of July Celebration include a parade down state street featuring local businesses and residents. Events include a breakfast at the city park, a carnival at the city park, a rodeo featuring local cowboys, and fireworks following the rodeo.

Mt. Pleasant Pioneer Day is held the last Saturday in March.

Education

Mount Pleasant is within the North Sanpete School District and has one elementary school and North Sanpete High School, the only high school in the district. The district's middle school is located in Moroni. Mount Pleasant is also home to Wasatch Academy, a private boarding school established in 1875.

Notable people
 Spencer Cox, 18th Governor of Utah and 8th Lieutenant Governor of Utah
 Leonard B. Jordan, 23rd Governor of Idaho and United States Senator from Idaho; born in Mount Pleasant.
 Mike Lookinland, actor
 Cyrus H. Wheelock, the author of the LDS hymn "Ye Elders of Israel"

References

Further reading

External links

 
 Mt. Pleasant Relic home and Blacksmith Shop
 City-Data.com Comprehensive Statistical Data and more about Mount Pleasant
 Mt. Pleasant Sanpete County website

Cities in Utah
Cities in Sanpete County, Utah
Populated places established in 1852
1852 establishments in Utah Territory